For other persons named John Gibbons see John Gibbons (disambiguation)

John Haskell "Tex" Gibbons (October 7, 1907 – May 30, 1984) was an American basketball player who competed in the 1936 Summer Olympics.

He was the captain of the 1936 Olympics American basketball team, which won the gold medal. He played one match.

He is also the father of Michael, Donald and educator William Gibbons, who also graduated from Brown University.

External links
Olympic profile

1907 births
1984 deaths
Basketball players at the 1936 Summer Olympics
Basketball players from Oklahoma
Medalists at the 1936 Summer Olympics
Olympic gold medalists for the United States in basketball
People from Elk City, Oklahoma
Phillips 66ers players
Southwestern Moundbuilders men's basketball players
United States men's national basketball team players
American men's basketball players
Burials at Rose Hills Memorial Park
Guards (basketball)